Diaphractanthus is a genus of flowering plants in the daisy family.

There is only one known species, Diaphractanthus bomolepis, endemic to Madagascar.

Some sources give the epithet as "homolepis" instead of "bomolepis." The original 1923 publication spelled it with a "b" alongside the description but with an "h" in the figure caption on the same page.

References

Monotypic Asteraceae genera
Endemic flora of Madagascar
Vernonieae
Taxa named by Jean-Henri Humbert